This is a list of seasons completed by the Ole Miss Rebels men's basketball team.

Yearly record 

  Kennedy coached the first 27 games of the season, going 11–16 and 4–10 in conference. Madlock finished the season, going 1–4 and 1–3 in conference

References

 

Ole Miss
Ole Miss Rebels basketball seasons